Eddie S Henderson Stadium (formerly Grady Stadium) is an Atlanta Public School football stadium located in Midtown Atlanta, south of Piedmont Park. The stadium is one of two stadiums owned and managed by the Atlanta Public School (APS) system, the other being Lakewood Stadium. It is the only high school stadium in APS that is located on the campus of a high school. The stadium was used as a training site for athletes during the 1996 Olympic Games, and occasionally hosts public practices for the Atlanta Falcons. Henderson Stadium was designed by Richard Aeck, and is considered a masterpiece of modern engineering expression. For the fall of 2009, Henderson Stadium was closed due to renovation. All games were played at Lakewood Stadium and the Georgia Dome.

The renovation was completed during Summer of 2010. A new running track and synthetic turf field was installed. The synthetic turf is FieldTurf. FieldTurf is also installed at Lakewood Stadium, the Georgia Dome and many other high-profile sports facilities worldwide.

In February 2021, the APS board unanimously approved renaming the stadium after Eddie S. Henderson, a former coach, principal, and athletics director for APS.

References 

American football venues in Atlanta
Ultimate (sport) venues
High school football venues in the United States
1948 establishments in Georgia (U.S. state)
Sports venues completed in 1948
Lacrosse venues in the United States